Frederick Henry Mollenkamp (March 15, 1890 – November 1, 1948) was a Major League Baseball first baseman who played for the Philadelphia Phillies in .

External links 

1890 births
1948 deaths
Philadelphia Phillies players
Major League Baseball first basemen
Baseball players from Ohio
Paris Bourbonites players
Charlotte Hornets (baseball) players
Port-Pleasant-Gallipolis (minor league baseball) players
Middleport-Pomeroy (minor league baseball) players